George Festeryga (July 31, 1926 – January 7, 2010) was a Grey Cup champion Canadian Football League player.

A graduate of the Hamilton Tigers junior and senior program, the big and talented Festeryga joined the Montreal Alouettes in 1949. Playing 9 regular season games, he was an integral part of their first Grey Cup championship. He later played for the Saskatchewan Roughriders and finished his career in 1952 after 2 seasons with the Edmonton Eskimos.

He later became a breeder of Appaloosa horses and Murray Grey cattle.

References

1926 births
2010 deaths
Sportspeople from Hamilton, Ontario
Players of Canadian football from Ontario
Edmonton Elks players
Hamilton Tigers football players
Montreal Alouettes players
Saskatchewan Roughriders players
Canadian people of Ukrainian descent